Insentiraja subtilispinosa, commonly known as the western looseskin skate or velvet skate, is a common deep water skate in the family Arhynchobatidae.

Distribution and habitat 
Although it is abundant in its known range, little is known about its biology.

Relationship to humans
Based on reported bycatch rates and population observances, there is no evidence to support concern of the western looseskin skate.

References

Rajiformes
Fish described in 1989